Requiem, Op. 33b, is a short a cappella choral piece by Icelandic composer Jón Leifs (1899–1968), dedicated to the memory of his daughter who drowned in a swimming accident shortly before her 18th birthday. The piece has only the name in common with the traditional Latin Mass for the dead. It is composed to a text which is a collage of Icelandic folk poetry and selections from a poem by Jónas Hallgrímsson. The music has the character of a lullaby and together with the text evokes the idea of a parent singing to a sleeping child. The piece is composed around an open fifth between A and E and constantly alternates between major and minor, ”giving it a serene halo mixing a sense of mystery, sadness and utter serenity“. Requiem is one of Leifs’ best-known compositions and contrasts with his general output, which is often described as "ungainly" and "dissonant".

References

Compositions by Jón Leifs
Leifs